A misnomer is a name that is incorrectly or unsuitably applied. Misnomers often arise because something was named long before its correct nature was known, or because an earlier form of something has been replaced by a later form to which the name no longer suitably applies. A misnomer may also be simply a word that someone uses incorrectly or misleadingly. The word "misnomer" does not mean "misunderstanding" or "popular misconception", and a number of misnomers remain in common usage — which is to say that a word being a misnomer does not necessarily make usage of the word incorrect.

Sources of misnomers 

Some of the sources of misnomers are:

 An older name being retained after the thing named has changed (e.g., tin can, mince meat pie, steamroller, tin foil, clothes iron, digital darkroom). This is essentially a metaphorical extension with the older item standing for anything filling its role.
 Transference of a well-known product brand name into a genericized trademark (e.g., Xerox for photocopy, Kleenex for tissues, or Jell-O for gelatin dessert).
 Pars pro toto, or a name applied to something that covers only part of a region. People often use Holland to mean the Netherlands, while it only designates a part of that country.
 Referring to the suburbs of a metropolis with the name of the biggest city in the metropolis.
 A name being based on a similarity in a particular aspect (e.g., "shooting stars" look like falling stars but are actually meteors).
 A difference between popular and technical meanings of a term. For example, a koala "bear" (see below) superficially looks and acts like a bear, but is quite distinct and unrelated. Similarly, fireflies fly like flies, and ladybugs look and act like bugs. Botanically, peanuts are not nuts, even though they look and taste somewhat like nuts. The technical sense is often cited as the "correct" sense, but this is a matter of context.
 Ambiguity (e.g., a parkway is generally a road with park-like landscaping, not a place to park). Such a term may confuse those unfamiliar with the language, dialect and/or word.
 Association of a thing with a place other than one might assume. For example, Panama hats originate from Ecuador, but came to be associated with the building of the Panama Canal.
 Naming particular to the originator's world view.
 An unfamiliar name (generally foreign) or technical term being re-analyzed as something more familiar (see folk etymology).
 Anachronisms, or terms that are juxtaposed in time, creating a chronological inconsistency.

Examples

Older name retained 

 The "lead" in pencils is made of graphite and clay, not lead; graphite was originally believed to be lead ore, but this is now known not to be the case. The graphite and clay mix is known as plumbago, meaning "lead ore" in Latin.
 Blackboards can be black, green, red, blue, or brown. 
 Sticks of chalk are no longer made of chalk, but of gypsum.
 Tin foil is almost always made of aluminium, whereas "tin cans" made for the storage of food products are made from steel with a thin tin plating. In both cases, tin was the original metal.
 Telephone numbers are usually referred to as being "dialed" although rotary phones are now rare.
 In golf, the clubs commonly referred to as woods are usually made of metal. The club heads for "woods" were formerly made predominantly of wood.

The term anachronym (note well -chron-) as defined in Garner's Modern English Usage  refers to this type of misnomer. Examples cited by Garner include the persistence of the word dial in its telephoning sense after the rotary dial era and the persistence of the term tin foil in the aluminum foil era. Anachronyms should not be homophonously confused with anacronyms (note well -acro-), which are words such as laser and sonar that have acronymic origin but are generally no longer treated like conventional acronyms (that is, they are used syntactically like any other words, without reference to their original expansions).

Similarity of appearance

Head cheese is a meat product.
A horned toad is a lizard. 
A velvet ant is a wasp.

Difference between common and technical meanings 

 Koala "bears" are marsupials not closely related to the bear family, Ursidae. The name "koala" is preferred in Australia, where koalas are native, but the term "koala bear" is still in use today outside of Australia.
 Jellyfish and starfish are not even distantly related to fish (although jellyfish do have a gelatinous structure similar to gelatin dessert).
 A peanut is not a nut in the botanical sense, but rather a legume. Similarly, a coconut is not a botanical nut but a drupe.
 Several fruit that are not berries include strawberries, bayberries, raspberries, and blackberries.
 Greenhouse effect is a misnomer because in a greenhouse, the warming principle is based on stopping the convection of air inside the greenhouse, whereas in the greenhouse effect, the greenhouse gases reflect radiation back to earth.

Association with place other than that which one may assume 

 The guinea pig (Cavia porcellus) originated in the Andes, not Guinea, and additionally is a rodent and unrelated to pigs.
 French horns originated in Germany, not France.
 Chinese checkers did not originate in China or in any other part of Asia.

Other 

 Although dry cleaning does not involve water, it does involve the use of liquid solvents.
 The "funny bone" is not a bone—the phrase refers to the ulnar nerve.
 A quantum leap is properly an instantaneous change that may be either large or small. In physics, it is a change of an electron from one energy level to another within an atom. In common usage, however, the term is often taken to mean a large, abrupt change.
 "Tennis elbow" (formally lateral epicondylitis) does not necessarily result from playing tennis.
 "Scientific racism" is not scientific, it was a pseudoscience.  There is nothing scientific about it. 
 The "Spanish flu" did not originate in Spain, but in USA.  It was just reported there first.

See also
Oxymoron
Metonymy

References

External links

English-language idioms
Semantics